Crataegus ambigua is a species of thorn (hawthorn) native to Western Asia and Eastern Europe, including Armenia, Iran, Russia, and Turkey. It grows as a shrub or tree up to about 12 m in height. The fruit is dark red to purple or black, with one or two stones (pyrenes).

Crataegus ambigua is closely related to Crataegus songarica, a species that has black fruit.

References

ambigua
Flora of Western Asia
Flora of Eastern Europe